James Mitton (1890–1949) was an English professional footballer who played as a centre-half. He made 160 appearances in the Football League for Stockport County and Exeter City.

Career
Born in Brierfield, Lancashire, Mitton started his career with Glossop but did not make a first-team appearance for the club before joining Stockport County in 1910. He made 56 league and cup appearances for the side over the next five seasons before football in England was abandoned due to the outbreak of the First World War. When competitive football resumed in 1919, Mitton returned to Stockport and played a further 34 league matches before leaving the club in 1921.

Mitton subsequently joined Third Division South outfit Exeter City and quickly established himself as a first-team regular, making 40 league appearances during the 1921–22 campaign. He went on to play 32 games the following season before returning to Lancashire to sign for newly promoted Second Division side Nelson in 1923. However, he failed to make an appearance during his one season with the Seedhill club, and retired from professional football in the summer of 1924.

References

1890 births
1949 deaths
People from Brierfield, Lancashire
English footballers
Association football defenders
Glossop North End A.F.C. players
Stockport County F.C. players
Exeter City F.C. players
Nelson F.C. players
English Football League players
Sportspeople from Lancashire